Jon Guenther is an American author of nearly forty novels in a variety of genres. In addition to books under his own name, he has written many novels in The Executioner series created by Don Pendleton about the fictional character Mack Bolan. He is also creator of the Christian Pulp brand and genre.

In addition to his credits as a prolific author, he is a former reviewer of science fiction and fantasy novels at SFRevu, and programming books on various subjects. He has also appeared as a speaker at venues throughout the United States on topics ranging from writing to programming.

In 2019, Jon Guenther announced his retirement as a "professional author" to focus solely on programming, but admits he continues to write and self-publish in his spare time as a creative endeavor.

Bibliography

Chaser Series
 Chaser (unabridged audio, 1998)
 Chaser's Return (unabridged audio, 1999)
 Chaser (TPB, 2010)
 Chaser's Return (TPB, 2012)

Standalone Novels
 Soul Runner: A Novel of High Adventure (TPB, 2009)
 Finding Faith (TPB, 2014)

External links 
Jon Guenther on Amazon.com
Don Pendleton's Original Executioner
Mack Bolan site

Living people
American software engineers
21st-century American novelists
American male novelists
Writers from Chicago
1968 births
21st-century American male writers
Novelists from Illinois
Engineers from Illinois